Kay Brainerd Slocum is an American musician and historian who has published books in music and medieval history. Slocum is currently the Gerhold Professor of History and Humanities at Capital University, Ohio, prior to which she taught music history and viola at Kent State University.  A violist, Slocum has performed with the Ohio Chamber Orchestra, the Buffalo Philharmonic Orchestra, the Erie Philharmonic, and the Youngstown Symphony.  She currently plays with the ProMusica Chamber Orchestra.

Select bibliography
(2004) Liturgies in Honor of Thomas Becket USA: University of Toronto Press  excerpts online
(2005) Medieval Civilisation.  London: Laurence King Publishing 
(2011) Sources in Medieval Culture and History USA: Prentice Hall

Notes

Living people
American medievalists
Women medievalists
American classical violists
Women violists
American music historians
Kent State University faculty
Capital University faculty
American women historians
Women writers about music
Year of birth missing (living people)
21st-century American women